The boys' 50 metre breaststroke event at the 2018 Summer Youth Olympics took place on 11 and 12 October at the Natatorium in Buenos Aires, Argentina.

Results

Heats
The heats were started on 11 October at 11:16.

Semifinals
The semifinals were started on 11 October at 18:58.

Final

The final was held on 12 October at 19:29.

References

Swimming at the 2018 Summer Youth Olympics